Georgia Fabish (born 31 January 1994, Wellington, New Zealand) is a New Zealand actress. She played in teen television series The Killian Curse and Paradise Café as well as appearing in Out of the Blue, a film depicting the 1990 Aramoana massacre in which a lone gunman murdered 13 people. She was nominated in the Best Supporting Actress category of the Qantas Film Awards for her role in Out of the Blue.

Credits
2010: Natasha, Paradise Café
2008: Shona, Paradise Café
2006: Chiquita Holden, Out of the Blue
2005-2007: Celia West, The Killian Curse
2005: Schoolgirl, Facelift

References

External links

New Zealand television actresses
Actresses from Wellington City
1994 births
Living people